MS Veendam is a cruise ship operated by Holland America Line from 1996 to 2020 and named after the municipality of Veendam in the Netherlands. In 2020, during the COVID-19 pandemic, the vessel was sold to Seajets, Greece, renamed Aegean Majesty, and has remained laid up.

Holland America Line
Veendamwas the fourth S-class/Statendam-class ship, ordered following the success of her three sister ships. Her keel was laid by Fincantieri as Hull Number 5954 in 1994. The ship was launched on 24 June 1995 and completed in May 1996. Actress Debbie Reynolds became the ship's godmother, and sailed on her maiden voyage on 15 May 1996. The ship was the fourth Holland America Line ship to be named after the town of Veendam, Netherlands. Her registered owner was Wind Surf Ltd, and she was registered at Nassau, Bahamas.

Veendam was transferred to the Netherlands flag in 2006 and to the ownership of HAL Nederland NV, Rotterdam, continuing under Holland America operation. In April 2009, the ship underwent dry dock renovations at Grand Bahama Shipyard in Freeport, Grand Bahama which included significant changes to her stern. Two new decks of verandah accommodation were added which necessitated the removal of a portion of her upper decks, and the bridge wings were extended. To structurally support the resulting change in weight, a ducktail was added to her hull.

During winter months Veendam operated from South American ports and, during the summer season, sailed from New York.

On 25 January 2015, Veendam was called by the United States Coast Guard to rescue a pilot who had ditched his plane after experiencing a mechanical failure  from the coast of Maui, Hawaii. Coordinating with the U.S. Coast Guard, Veendam launched Lifeboat 2 in a successful rescue operation.

Later history
The ship was sold in July 2020, during the COVID-19 pandemic, to Greek ferry operator Seajets along with sistership Maasdam. After delivery in Katakolon, Greece in August, Veendam was renamed Aegean Majesty by registered owner Mediterranean Dream Inc, reflagged from Netherlands to Bermuda, and berthed at Corinth. In the early morning of 7 November 2020, in strong winds, the ship broke its moorings in Corinth and grounded on a sandbank in the harbour. Two days later she was refloated, undamaged.

References

External links

 Veendam official page (2008)

 

Ships built by Fincantieri
Ships built in Monfalcone
Ships of the Holland America Line
Ships of Seajets
1995 ships